Three Houses  ( / ) is a 2008 Georgian surrealist drama film directed by Zaza Urushadze.

Cast
Janri Lolashvili
Zurab Kipshidze
Murman Jinoria
Eka Andronikashvili
Nata Murvanidze
Tornike Bziava
Nineli Chankvetadze
Malkhaz Abuladze
Murman Jinoria
Nino Koridze
Dato Iashvili

References

External links
 

Drama films from Georgia (country)
2000s Georgian-language films
2008 films
2008 drama films
Films directed by Zaza Urushadze